The black-striped sparrow (Arremonops conirostris) is a passerine bird found from eastern Honduras to western Ecuador, northern Brazil, and Venezuela.

This American sparrow is a common bird in humid lowlands and foothills up to  altitude, in semiopen habitats such as thickets, young second growth, overgrown fields, shady plantations, and gardens.

The large, domed nest, built by the female, is made of coarse plant material and has a wide side entrance. The clutch is two, rarely three, unmarked white eggs, which are incubated by the female alone for 12–14 days before hatching.

The adult is distinctive, with a grey head which has broad black stripes each side of the crown and narrower black stripes through each eye. The upperparts are olive, with yellow on the bend of the wing. The underparts are dull white shading to grey on the breast sides and to olive on the lower belly. Young birds have brown stripes on a yellower head, brownish-olive upperparts and yellow-olive underparts.

This species resembles the olive sparrow, but is larger, and the ranges do not overlap. The seven subspecies are:
 A. c. conirostris (Bonaparte, 1850), the nominate, breeds in most of northern South America.
 A. c. inexpectatus Chapman, 1914 breeds in part of western Colombia. It is small, dull, and brownish-olive above.
 A. c. pastazae Krabbe & Stejskal, 2008 is found in eastern Ecuador
 A. c. richmondii Ridgway, 1898 breeds in Central America south to western Panama. It is smaller and brighter than nominate A. c. conirostris.
 A. c. striaticeps (Lafresnaye, 1853) breeds from central Panama to western Ecuador. It is whiter below than nominate A. c.  conirostris or A. c. richmondii.
 A. c. umbrinus Todd, 1923 breeds in the Maracaibo basin of northern Colombia and Venezuela. It is another small, dull race, but brighter above and slightly larger than A. c. inexpectatus.
 A. c. viridicatus Wetmore, 1957 breeds on Isla de Coiba, Panama. It is greyer on the head, breast, and flanks than A. c. striaticeps.

The black-striped sparrow has a metallic  call. The male's song, given from the ground or a low perch, consists of a whistles and slurred notes, followed by a trill, but varies geographically.

The black-striped sparrow feeds on insects, spiders, and seeds taken on the ground, and also picks berries and invertebrate prey from low bushes. It is seen in pairs, never in flocks, and is a shy and retiring species.

References

Further reading

External links

 
 
 
 
 

black-striped sparrow
Birds of Nicaragua
Birds of Costa Rica
Birds of Panama
Birds of Colombia
Birds of Venezuela
Birds of Ecuador
black-striped sparrow
black-striped sparrow